The 2017 Abu Dhabi Grand Prix (formally known as the 2017 Formula 1 Etihad Airways Abu Dhabi Grand Prix) was a Formula One motor race held on 26 November 2017 at the Yas Marina Circuit in Abu Dhabi, United Arab Emirates.

Mercedes driver Valtteri Bottas controlled the pace throughout the race to win from pole position. Lewis Hamilton finished in close second place, with Sebastian Vettel finishing third. Red Bull's Daniel Ricciardo retired due to mechanical failure, which was significant in facilitating fourth place for Kimi Räikkönen in the Driver's Championship. This was also the final Grand Prix for 11-time Grand Prix winner and  runner-up Felipe Massa. 

The first Formula One eSports event was held in tandem with the Grand Prix, with British competitor Brendon Leigh winning the 2017 competition.

This was Bottas's last win until the 2019 Australian Grand Prix.

Report

Background
With both championships and the top places almost settled, the final race of the season would settle an intense three-way battle for sixth place between constructors Toro Rosso, Renault and Haas. Toro Rosso was ahead by 4 points, but running with two recently signed drivers who were yet to score a point. Renault was then 2 points ahead of Haas. Also, fourth place in the Drivers' Championship was unsettled, contested by Daniel Ricciardo and Kimi Räikkönen. Ricciardo was 7 points ahead of Räikkönen.

The Abu Dhabi Grand Prix takes place at sunset, leading to great changes in track and air temperature. Free practices 1 and 3 are in afternoon heat, whereas free practice 2, qualifying and the race begin in the slightly cooler evening. The temperatures further evolve through the race, as it usually lasts two hours and spans the sunset.

The weekend marked the final Formula One race for Felipe Massa. Throughout his F1 career, Massa scored 11 wins, 16 pole positions, 15 fastest laps, 41 podiums, and 1167 career points. It was also the last Formula One race to date for Pascal Wehrlein, as he returned to the Deutsche Tourenwagen Masters.  As of 2022, this was the last race to feature a Brazilian driver. This was also the last Formula One race broadcast by NBC Sports in the United States; the rights went to ESPN for 2018.

Free practice
Sebastian Vettel set the fastest lap time in FP1 for Ferrari, just over a tenth of a second faster than Mercedes' Lewis Hamilton in second, with Max Verstappen close behind in his Red Bull. Hamilton bettered Vettel's fastest lap time in FP2, followed by Ricciardo's Red Bull. Hamilton retained the fastest lap time in FP3. During this session, the lap times increased in speed. At about the half-way point, Räikkönen's Ferrari bettered Hamilton's time and Vettel's came within a whisker. After this, Hamilton again improved his time, and Valtteri Bottas improved to second, for a Mercedes one-two. Hamilton's final fastest lap was almost 3 tenths faster than Bottas in second and over half a second faster than both Räikkönen in third and Vettel in fourth. Red Bull set fifth and sixth and McLaren set seventh and eighth.

Qualifying
All cars were fitted with Pirelli ultrasoft tyres for Q1. Hamilton and Bottas traded lap times whilst Räikkönen appeared to outpace Vettel in the following two positions. In Q2, Hamilton set a marginally faster time than Bottas, whilst Vettel likewise pipped Räikkönen. In both sessions, the Red Bulls were further behind, with Ricciardo in fifth and Verstappen in sixth.

The final qualifying round saw Bottas set a faster time than Hamilton early, with neither improving. Hamilton qualified in P2, with Vettel remaining ahead of Räikkönen. An unexpected change to the order arose when Ricciardo set a late lap ahead of Räikkönen taking P4. Räikkönen was in P5 and Verstappen in P6. Further back, Renault's Nico Hülkenberg qualified ahead of the Force Indias, amongst which Sergio Pérez led Esteban Ocon. Felipe Massa completed the top-ten.

Race
After the front-runners all made a good start, positions at the front of the field did not change from the start grid into the opening laps. Mercedes driver Bottas retained first place from pole position. Hamilton followed Bottas closely, able to challenge for position at times. Hamilton later congratulated Bottas on his dominant performance, saying the former 'gave it everything, every single lap'. Bottas said that he had been "managing the pace and that way the race", and "it was a nice feeling, a really nice feeling", suggested he could have pushed harder. Indeed, Bottas set the fastest lap of the race in the closing stages.

Behind, Vettel remained in third place through most of the race, largely neither challenged for the podium nor mounting a convincing challenge against Hamilton's second place. Räikkönen put his nose ahead of Ricciardo on the opening lap, but Ricciardo held fourth place until retiring due to a hydraulic failure on lap 21. Both Toro Rosso drivers spun off the track, but rejoined to complete the race as back-markers. All cars ran a one-stop strategy. Carlos Sainz Jr., one of the later cars to pit, was released by Renault with the left-front wheel loose. Sainz made it out of the pitlane before retiring, and Renault incurred a fine for the unsafe release. The other Renault driver Nico Hülkenberg incurred a 5-second stop-go penalty early in the race for gaining an advantage cutting a corner. Later serving the penalty during a scheduled pit-stop, there was a delay removing the right-rear wheel reducing his track position to 11th. He fought back up to 6th place to secure the points required to lift Renault up to sixth in the Constructors' Championship.

The top three remained the same throughout most of the race, Hamilton taking the lead briefly between Bottas' earlier pit-stop and his own pit-stop. Bottas won the race. Hamilton finished in close second place, with Vettel finishing third. Ricciardo's retirement was significant in handing the fourth place in the Drivers' Championship to Räikkönen. Excluding the retired Ricciardo, the top eight places were ordered identically to the starting grid. Fernando Alonso had overtaken Massa for ninth. Massa finished in tenth (the last points-paying) position in the final Formula One Grand Prix of his career.

Classification

Qualifying

Notes
 – Brendon Hartley received a 10-place grid penalty for exceeding his quota of power unit components.

Race

Final Championship standings

Drivers' Championship standings

Constructors' Championship standings

 Note: Only the top five positions are included for the sets of standings.
 Bold text indicates the 2017 World Champions.

See also 
 2017 Yas Island Formula 2 round
 2017 Yas Marina GP3 Series round

References

External links

Abu Dhabi
Abu Dhabi Grand Prix
Abu Dhabi Grand Prix
Abu Dhabi Grand Prix